{{Infobox province or territory of Canada
| name                    = Northwest Territories
| settlement_type         = Territory
| other_name              = 
| image_flag              = Flag of the Northwest Territories.svg
| image_shield            = Coat_of_arms_of_Northwest_Territories.svg
| image_map               = Northwest Territories in Canada 2.svg
| Label_map               = yes
| coordinates             = 
| official_lang           = 
| capital                 = Yellowknife
| largest_city            = Yellowknife
| largest_metro           = Yellowknife
| Premier                 = Caroline Cochrane
| government_type         = Parliamentary system, with consensus government
| Viceroy                 = Margaret Thom
| ViceroyType             = Commissioner
| Legislature             = Legislative Assembly of the Northwest Territories
| area_footnotes          = 
| area_rank               = 3rd
| area_total_km2          = 1346106
| area_land_km2           = 1183085
| area_water_km2          = 163021
| PercentWater            = 13.5
| population_demonym      = Northwest TerritorianFR: | population_rank         = 11th
| population_total        = 41070
| population_ref          = 
| population_as_of        = 2021
| population_est          = 45602
| pop_est_as_of           = Q4 2022
| pop_est_ref             = 
| DensityRank             = 12th
| Density_km2             = 0.035
| GDP_year                = 2017
| GDP_total               = C$4.856 billion
| GDP_rank                = 11th
| GDP_per_capita          = C$108,065
| GDP_per_capita_rank     = 1st
| HDI_year                = 2018
| HDI                     = 0.908—Very high
| HDI_rank                = 5th
| AdmittanceOrder         = 5th, with Manitoba
| AdmittanceDate          = July 15, 1870
| HouseSeats              = 1
| SenateSeats             = 1
| timezone1               =
| utc_offset1             = −07:00
| timezone1_DST           =
| utc_offset1_DST         =
| PostalAbbreviation      = NT
| PostalCodePrefix         = X0, X1 (Yellowknife)
| iso_code                = CA-NT
| website                 = 
| flower                  = Mountain avens
| tree                    = Tamarack Larch
| bird                    = Gyrfalcon
}}
Its estimated population as of 2022 is 45,605. Yellowknife is the capital, most populous community, and only city in the territory; its population was 19,569 as of the 2016 census. It became the territorial capital in 1967, following recommendations by the Carrothers Commission.

The Northwest Territories, a portion of the old North-Western Territory, entered the Canadian Confederation on July 15, 1870. Since then, the territory has been divided four times to create new provinces and territories or enlarge existing ones. Its current borders date from April 1, 1999, when the territory's size was decreased again by the creation of a new territory of Nunavut to the east, through the Nunavut Act and the Nunavut Land Claims Agreement. While Nunavut is mostly Arctic tundra, the Northwest Territories has a slightly warmer climate and is both boreal forest (taiga) and tundra, and its most northern regions form part of the Arctic Archipelago.

The Northwest Territories is bordered by Canada's two other territories, Nunavut to the east and Yukon to the west, and by the provinces of British Columbia, Alberta, and Saskatchewan to the south; it also touches Manitoba to the southeast at a quadripoint that includes Nunavut and Saskatchewan. The land area of the Northwest Territories is vast enough to be roughly equal to France, Portugal and Spain combined, although its overall area is even larger because of its vast lakes that freeze over in winter.

Name

The name is descriptive, adopted by the British government during the colonial era to indicate where it lay in relation to the rest of Rupert's Land. The northernmost region of the territory is home to the Inuvialuit, who primarily live in the Inuvialuit Settlement Region (Inuvialuit Nunangit Sannaiqtuaq), while the southern portion is called  (an Athabaskan language word meaning "our land").  is the vast Dene country, stretching from central Alaska to Hudson Bay, within which lie the homelands of the numerous Dene nations.

There has been some discussion of changing the name of the Northwest Territories after the splitting off of Nunavut, possibly to a term from an Indigenous language. One proposal was "Denendeh", as advocated by the former premier Stephen Kakfwi, among others. One of the most popular proposals for a new name—to name the territory "Bob"—began as a prank, but for a while it was at or near the top in the public-opinion polls.

Geography
Located in northern Canada, the territory borders Canada's two other territories, Yukon to the west and Nunavut to the east, as well as four provinces: British Columbia to the southwest, Alberta and Saskatchewan to the south, and Manitoba (through a quadripoint) to the extreme southeast.

Territorial islands in the Canadian Arctic Archipelago include Banks Island, Borden Island, Prince Patrick Island, and parts of Victoria Island and Melville Island.

Climate

The southern part of the territory (most of the mainland portion) has a subarctic climate, while the islands and northern coast have a polar climate.

Summers in the north are short and cool, featuring daytime highs of 14–17 degrees Celsius (57–63 °F) and lows of 1–5 degrees Celsius (34–41 °F). Winters are long and harsh, with daytime highs  and lows . The coldest nights typically reach  each year.

Extremes are common with summer highs in the south reaching  and lows reaching below . In winter in the south, it is not uncommon for the temperatures to reach , but they can also reach the low teens during the day. In winter in the north it is not uncommon for the temperatures to reach  but they can also reach single digits during the day.

Thunderstorms are not rare in the south. In the north they are very rare, but do occur. Tornadoes are extremely rare but have happened with the most notable one happening just outside Yellowknife that destroyed a communications tower. The Territory has a fairly dry climate due to the mountains in the west.

About half of the territory is above the tree line. There are not many trees in most of the eastern areas of the territory, or in the north islands.

History

Beginning prior to the arrival of Europeans, a number of First Nations and Inuit have resided in, and continue to reside in, the area of the Northwest Territories. Inuit groups include the Caribou, Central, and Copper. First Nations groups include the Dane-zaa (Beaver), Chipewyan, Tłı̨chǫ (Dogrib), Tahltan (Nahani), Sekani, Slavey, and Yellowknives.

In 1670, the Hudson's Bay Company (HBC) was formed from a royal charter, and was granted a commercial monopoly over Rupert's Land. Present day Northwest Territories laid northwest of Rupert's Land, and was known as the North-Western Territory. Although not formally part of Rupert's Land, the HBC made regular use of the region as a part of its trading area. The Treaty of Utrecht saw the British become the only European power with practical access to the North-Western Territory, with the French surrendering their claim to the Hudson Bay coast.

Europeans have visited the region for the purposes of fur trading, and exploration for new trade routes, including the Northwest Passage. Arctic expeditions launched in the 19th century include the Coppermine expedition.

In 1867, the first Canadian residential school opened in the region in Fort Resolution. The opening of the school was followed by several others in regions across the territory, thus contributing to it reaching the highest percentage of students in residential schools compared to other area in Canada.

The present-day territory came under the authority of the Government of Canada in July 1870, after the Hudson's Bay Company transferred Rupert's Land and the North-Western Territory to the British Crown, which subsequently transferred them to Canada, giving it the name the North-West Territories. This immense region comprised all of today's Canada except British Columbia, an early form of Manitoba (a small square area around Winnipeg), early forms of present-day Ontario and Quebec (the coast of the Great Lakes, the Saint Lawrence River valley and the southern third of modern Quebec), the Maritimes (Nova Scotia, Prince Edward Island and New Brunswick), Newfoundland, the Labrador coast, and the Arctic Islands (except the southern half of Baffin Island).

After the 1870 transfer, some of the North-West Territories was whittled away. The province of Manitoba was enlarged in 1881 to a rectangular region composing the modern province's south. By the time British Columbia joined Confederation on July 20, 1871, it had already (1866) been granted the portion of North-Western Territory south of 60 degrees north and west of 120 degrees west, an area that comprised most of the Stickeen Territories.

The North-West Territories Council was created in 1875 for more local government in the North-West Territories. At first wholly made up of appointed members, it got its first elected members in 1882 and became wholly elected in 1888 when the council was reorganized as the Legislative Assembly of the North-West Territories. Frederick Haultain, an Ontario lawyer who practised at Fort Macleod from 1884, became its chairman in 1891 and Premier when the Assembly was reorganized in 1897. The modern provinces of Saskatchewan and Alberta were created in 1905. Contemporary records show Haultain recommended that the NWT become a single province, named Buffalo, but the Canadian government of Sir Wilfrid Laurier acted otherwise.Mardon and Mardon, Alberta Election Results, 1882-1992, p. 195

In the meantime, the Province of Ontario was enlarged north-westward in 1882. Quebec was also extended northwards in 1898. Yukon was made a separate territory that year, due to the Klondike Gold Rush, to free the North-West Territories government in Regina from the burden of addressing the problems caused by the sudden boom of population and economic activity, and the influx of non-Canadians. One year after the provinces of Alberta and Saskatchewan were created in 1905, the Parliament of Canada renamed the "North-West Territories" as the Northwest Territories, dropping all hyphenated forms of it.

Manitoba, Ontario and Quebec acquired the last addition to their modern landmass from the Northwest Territories in 1912. This left only the districts of Mackenzie, Franklin (which absorbed the remnants of Ungava in 1920) and Keewatin within what was then given the name Northwest Territories. In 1925, the boundaries of the Northwest Territories were extended all the way to the North Pole on the sector principle, vastly expanding its territory onto the northern ice cap. Between 1925 and 1999, the Northwest Territories covered a land area of —larger than one-third of Canada in terms of area.

On April 1, 1999, a separate Nunavut territory was formed from the eastern Northwest Territories to represent the Inuit.

Demography

The NWT is one of two jurisdictions in Canada – Nunavut being the other – where Indigenous peoples are in the majority, constituting 50.4% of the population.

According to the 2016 Canadian census, the 10 major ethnic groups were:

 First Nations – 36.8%
 Canadian – 18.6%
 English – 15.9%
 Scottish – 14.8%
 Irish – 12.3%
 Inuit (Inuvialuit) – 10.9%
 French – 10.3%
 German – 8.3%
 Métis – 7.1%
 Ukrainian – 3.1%

1.Yukon was ceded from the Northwest Territories in 1898.
2.Alberta and Saskatchewan were created mostly from parts of the Northwest Territories in 1905.
3.Nunavut was separated from the Northwest Territories in 1999.

Language

French was made an official language in 1877 by the then-territorial government. After a lengthy and bitter debate resulting from a speech from the throne in 1888 by Lieutenant Governor Joseph Royal, the members of the time voted on more than one occasion to nullify this and make English the only language used in the assembly. After some conflict with the Confederation Government in Ottawa, and a decisive vote on January 19, 1892, the assembly members voted for an English-only territory.

Currently, the Northwest Territories' Official Languages Act recognizes the following eleven official languages:

 Chipewyan/Dené
 Cree
 English
 French
 Gwich’in
 Inuinnaqtun
 Inuktitut
 Inuvialuktun
 North Slavey
 South Slavey
 Tłı̨chǫ (Dogrib)

NWT residents have a right to use any of the above languages in a territorial court, and in the debates and proceedings of the legislature. However, the laws are legally binding only in their French and English versions, and the NWT government only publishes laws and other documents in the territory's other official languages when the legislature asks it to. Furthermore, access to services in any language is limited to institutions and circumstances where there is a significant demand for that language or where it is reasonable to expect it given the nature of the services requested. In practical terms, English language services are universally available, and there is no guarantee that other languages, including French, will be used by any particular government service, except for the courts.

The 2016 census returns showed a population of 41,786. Of the 40,565 singular responses to the census question regarding each inhabitant's "mother tongue", the most reported languages were the following (italics indicate an official language of the NWT):

There were also 630 responses of both English and a "non-official language"; 35 of both French and a "non-official language"; 145 of both English and French, and about 400 people who either did not respond to the question, or reported multiple non-official languages, or else gave some other unenumerable response. (Figures shown are for the number of single language responses and the percentage of total single-language responses.)

Religion
In the 2021 Census, 55.2% of the population followed Christianity down from 67.6% in the 2001 Census. At the same time, the population reported having no religious affiliation has more than doubled, from 17.4% in 2001 to 39.8% in 2021 census.About 5.0% reported other religious affiliations.

Communities

As of 2014, there are 33 official communities in the NWT. These range in size from Yellowknife with a population of 19,569 to Kakisa with 36 people. Governance of each community differs, some are run under various types of First Nations control, while others are designated as a city, town, village or hamlet, but most communities are municipal corporations. Yellowknife is the largest community and has the largest number of Aboriginal peoples, 4,520 (23.4%) people. However, Behchokǫ̀, with a population of 1,874, is the largest First Nations community, 1,696 (90.9%), and Inuvik with 3,243 people is the largest Inuvialuit community, 1,315 (40.5%). There is one Indian reserve in the NWT, Hay River Reserve, located on the south shore of the Hay River.

Economy
The gross domestic product of the Northwest Territories was C$4.856 billion in 2017. It has the highest per capita GDP of all provinces and territories in Canada, totalling C$76,000 in 2009.

Mining
The Territories' geological resources include gold, diamonds, natural gas and petroleum. BP is the only oil company currently producing oil there. Its diamonds are promoted as an alternative to purchasing blood diamonds. Two of the biggest mineral resource companies in the world, BHP and Rio Tinto mine many of their diamonds there. In 2010, Territories' accounted for 28.5% of Rio Tinto's total diamond production (3.9 million carats, 17% more than in 2009, from the Diavik Diamond Mine) and 100% of BHP's (3.05 million carats from the EKATI mine).

The Eldorado Mine produced uranium for the Manhattan Project, as well as radium, silver, and copper (for other uses).

 Eldorado Mine – 1933–1940, 1942–1960, 1976–1982 (radium, uranium, silver, copper)
 Con Mine – 1938–2003 (gold)
 Negus Mine – 1939–1952 (gold)
 Ptarmigan and Tom Mine – 1941–1942, 1986–1997 (gold)
 Thompson-Lundmark Mine – 1941–1943, 1947–1949 (gold)
 Giant Mine – 1948–2004 (gold)
 Discovery Mine – 1950–1969 (gold)
 Rayrock Mine – 1957–1959 (uranium)
 Camlaren Mine – 1962–1963, 1980–1981 (gold)
 Cantung Mine – 1962–1986, 2002–2003, 2005–2015 (tungsten)
 Echo Bay Mines – 1964–1975 (silver and copper)
 Pine Point Mine – 1964–1988 (lead and zinc)
 Tundra Mine – 1964–1968 (gold)
 Terra Mine – 1969–1985 (silver and copper)
 Salmita Mine – 1983–1987 (gold)
 Colomac Mine – 1990–1992, 1994–1997 (gold)
 Ekati Diamond Mine – 1998–current (diamonds)
 Diavik Diamond Mine – 2003–current (diamonds)
 Snap Lake Diamond Mine – 2007–2015 (diamonds)

Tourism

During the winter, many international visitors go to Yellowknife to watch the auroras. Five areas managed by Parks Canada are situated within the territory: Aulavik and Tuktut Nogait National Parks are in the northern part. Portions of Wood Buffalo National Park are located within it, although most of it is located in neighbouring Alberta. Parks Canada also manages two park reserves, Nááts'ihch'oh, and Nahanni National Park Reserves.

Government

As a territory, the NWT has fewer rights than the provinces. During his term, Premier Kakfwi pushed to have the federal government accord more rights to the territory, including having a greater share of the returns from the territory's natural resources go to the territory. Devolution of powers to the territory was an issue in the 20th general election in 2003, and has been ever since the territory began electing members in 1881.

The Commissioner of the NWT is the chief executive and is appointed by the Governor-in-Council of Canada on the recommendation of the federal Minister of Aboriginal Affairs and Northern Development. The position used to be more administrative and governmental, but with the devolution of more powers to the elected assembly since 1967, the position has become symbolic. The commissioner had full governmental powers until 1980 when the territories were given greater self-government. The legislative assembly then began electing a cabinet and government leader, later known as the premier. Since 1985 the commissioner no longer chairs meetings of the executive council (or cabinet), and the federal government has instructed commissioners to behave like a provincial lieutenant governor. Unlike lieutenant governors, the Commissioner of the Northwest Territories is not a formal representative of the King of Canada.

Unlike provincial governments and the government of Yukon, the government of the Northwest Territories does not have political parties. It never has had political parties except for the period between 1898 and 1905. Its legislative assembly operates through the consensus government model.
The website of the NWT government describes consensus government thusly:
"The Northwest Territories is one of only two jurisdictions in Canada with a consensus system of government instead of one based on party politics. In our system, all Members of the Legislative Assembly (MLAs) are elected as independents. Shortly after the election, all Members meet as a Caucus to set priorities for that Assembly. The Caucus remains active throughout their term as the forum where all Members meet as equals.[...]
Compared to the party system, there is much more communication between Regular Members and Cabinet. All legislation, major policies, and proposed budgets pass through the Regular Members’ standing committees before coming to the House."

The NWT Legislative Assembly is composed of one member elected from each of the nineteen constituencies. After each general election, the new assembly elects the premier and the speaker by secret ballot. Seven MLAs are also chosen as cabinet ministers, with the remainder forming the opposition.

The membership of the current legislative assembly was set by the 2019 Northwest Territories general election on October 1, 2019. Caroline Cochrane was selected as the new premier on October 24, 2019.

The member of Parliament for the Northwest Territories is Michael McLeod (Liberal Party). The Commissioner of the Northwest Territories is Margaret Thom.

In the Parliament of Canada, the NWT comprises a single Senate division and a single House of Commons electoral district, titled Northwest Territories (Western Arctic until 2014). Thus a single MP represents an area that is almost 14 percent of the land area of all of Canada.

Administrative regions

The Northwest Territories is divided into five administrative regions (regional offices in parenthesis):

 Dehcho Region (Fort Simpson)
 Inuvik Region (Inuvik)
 North Slave Region (Yellowknife and Behchoko [sub-office])
 Sahtu Region (Norman Wells)
 South Slave Region (Fort Smith and Hay River [sub-office])

Departments
The government of Northwest Territories comprises the following departments:

 Education, culture and employment
 Environment and natural resources
 Executive and Indigenous affairs
 Finance
 Health and social services
 Industry, tourism and investment
 Infrastructure
 Justice
 Lands
 Legislative assembly
 Municipal and community affairs

Culture

Aboriginal issues in the Northwest Territories include the fate of the Dene who, in the 1940s, were employed to carry radioactive uranium ore from the mines on Great Bear Lake. Of the thirty plus miners who worked at the Port Radium site, at least fourteen have died due to various forms of cancer. A study was done in the community of Deline, called A Village of Widows by Cindy Kenny-Gilday, which indicated that the number of people involved were too small to be able to confirm or deny a link.

There has been racial tension based on a history of violent conflict between the Dene and the Inuit, who have now taken recent steps towards reconciliation.

Land claims in the NWT began with the Inuvialuit Final Agreement, signed on June 5, 1984. It was the first Land Claim signed in the Territory, and the second in Canada. It culminated with the creation of the Inuit homeland of Nunavut, the result of the Nunavut Land Claims Agreement, the largest land claim in Canadian history.

Another land claims agreement with the Tłı̨chǫ people created a region within the NWT called Tli Cho, between Great Bear and Great Slave Lakes, which gives the Tłı̨chǫ their own legislative bodies, taxes, resource royalties, and other affairs, though the NWT still maintains control over such areas as health and education. This area includes two of Canada's three diamond mines, at Ekati and Diavik.

Festivals

Among the festivals in the region are the Great Northern Arts Festival, the Snowking Winter Festival, Folk on the Rocks music festival in Yellowknife, and Rockin the Rocks.

Transportation

Road

Northwest Territories has nine numbered highways. The longest is the Mackenzie Highway, which stretches from the Alberta Highway 35's northern terminus in the south at the Alberta – Northwest Territories border at the 60th parallel to Wrigley, Northwest Territories in the north. Ice roads and winter roads are also prominent and provide road access in winter to towns and mines which would otherwise be fly-in locations. Yellowknife Highway branches out from Mackenzie Highway and connects it to Yellowknife. Dempster Highway is the continuation of Klondike Highway. As of 2017, the all-season Inuvik-Tuktoyaktuk Highway connects Inuvik to communities along the Arctic Ocean as an extension of the Dempster Highway.

Yellowknife did not have an all-season road access to the rest of Canada's highway network until the completion of Deh Cho Bridge in 2012. Prior to that, traffic relied on ferry service in summer and ice road in winter to cross the Mackenzie River. This became a problem during spring and fall time when the ice was not thick enough to handle vehicle load but the ferry could not pass through the ice, which would require all goods from fuel to groceries to be airlifted during the transition period.

The Northwest Territories is the only jurisdiction in North America to issue a non rectangular standard license plate. Instead, the territory issues a polar bear shaped license plate.

Public transit
Yellowknife Transit is the public transportation agency in the city, and is the only transit system within the Northwest Territories.

Air

Yellowknife Airport is the largest airport in the territory in terms of aircraft movements and passengers. It is the gateway airport to other destinations within the Northwest Territories. As the airport of the territory capital, it is part of the National Airports System. It is the hub of multiple regional airlines. Major airlines serving destinations within Northwest Territories include Buffalo Airways, Canadian North, First Air, North-Wright Airways.

See also

 List of airports in the Northwest Territories
 List of National Parks of Canada
 List of Northwest Territories highways
 List of Northwest Territories Legislative Assemblies
 List of Northwest Territories plebiscites
 List of communities in the Northwest Territories
 List of ghost towns in the Northwest Territories
 Scouting and Guiding in the Northwest Territories
 Symbols of the Northwest Territories

Notes

References

Further reading

 
 
 Ecosystem Classification Group, and Northwest Territories. Ecological Regions of the Northwest Territories Taiga Plains''. Yellowknife, NWT: Dept. of Environment and Natural Resources, Govt. of the Northwest Territories, 2007.

External links

 
 
 Northwest Territories Tourism
 Prince of Wales Northern Heritage Centre
 Aurora College
 NWT Archives
 NWT Literacy Council
 Language Commissioner of the Northwest Territories
 Lessons From the Land: interactive journeys of NWT traditional Aboriginal trails
 CBC Digital Archives – Northwest Territories: Voting in Canada's North
 Northwest Territories Act

 
1870 establishments in Canada
Arctic Ocean
Beaufort Sea
States and territories established in 1870
Provinces and territories of Canada